The Selenocosmiinae are a subfamily of tarantulas (Mygalomorphae: Theraphosidae) found throughout South-East Asia and Australia. This subfamily is defined by the presence of a lyra on the maxillae and strikers on the chelicerae, allowing these spiders to stridulate and produce a "hissing" sound. However some species within  Phlogiellus may have secondary lost their lyra but retain their strikers. The monophyly of the subfamily has been only tested using genetic data with a handful of genera or species in a few studies. However, these studies found genera that had been previously placed in this subfamily were actual their own separate subfamily (Poecilotheria) and that Selenocosmiinae is most closely related to the Indian Thrigmopoeinae. As of 2021, Selenocosmiinae contains 11 genera.

Genera 

 Birupes Gabriel & Sherwood, 2019
Chilobrachys Karsch, 1891
 Coremiocnemis Simon, 1892
 Haplocosmia Schmidt & von Wirth, 1996
 Lyrognathus Pocock, 1895
 Orphnaecus Simon, 1892
 Phlogiellus Pocock, 1897
 Psednocnemis West, Nunn & Hogg, 2012
 Selenocosmia Ausserer, 1871
 Selenotholus Hogg, 1902
 Selenotypus Pocock, 1895

References

External links 
 
 

Theraphosidae
Spider subfamilies
Spiders of Asia